Sarvelayat District is a district (bakhsh) in Nishapur County, Razavi Khorasan province, Iran. At the 2006 census, its population was 17,962, in 4,805 families.  The district has one city: Chekneh.  The district has two rural districts (dehestan): Barzanun Rural District and Sarvelayat Rural District.

References 

Districts of Razavi Khorasan Province
Nishapur County